The 2016 Pan American Women's Junior Handball Championship was held in the city of Foz do Iguaçu, Brazil from 15 to 19 March 2016. It acts as the American qualifying tournament for the 2016 Women's Junior World Handball Championship.

Results

Round robin

Final standing

References

External links
Page of the championship on PATHF website
Page of the championship on CBHb website

Pan American Women's Junior Handball Championship
Pan American Women's Junior Handball Championship
Pan American Women's Junior Handball Championship
Junior
2016 in Brazilian women's sport